The Match (Korean: 승부; RR: Seungbu; lit. "The Game") is an upcoming South Korean biopic directed and written by Kim Hyung-joo based on two real-life notable Go players Cho Hun-hyun and Lee Chang-ho. The film stars Lee Byung-hun and Yoo Ah-in, and is set to be released in South Korea in 2023 on Netflix.

Plot 
Set in the 1980s-1990s and based on two real-life notable Go players, the film tells the story of Cho Hun-hyun, a Go champion who discovers a gifted but untrained young boy Lee Chang-ho in an amateur contest. He takes him under his wing to turn into a professional player. Conflicts arise when the protégé later turns against his teachings.

Cast

Main
 Lee Byung-hun as Cho Hun-hyun
 Yoo Ah-in as Lee Chang-ho
 Kim Kang-hoon as young Lee Chang-ho

Supporting
 Moon Jung-hee as Jung Mi-hwa, Cho Hun-yun's wife
 Ko Chang-seok as Lee Chang-ho's father

Production

Casting 
In October 2020, Lee Byung-hun and Yoo Ah-in joined the cast of the film, followed by Moon Jung-hee and child actor Kim Kang-hoon.

Filming 
Principal photography began on December 17, 2020. Filming took place in Yeongnam, Gyeongsang Province and Gangwon-do, and wrapped up in July, 2021.

Release
The Match is scheduled to be released on Netflix in 2023. Prior to the release, the film launched international sales and was screened at the Busan International Film Festival's Asian Contents & Film Market in October 2021.

References

External links

2023 films
Drama films based on actual events
Go films
Films about sportspeople
2020s Korean-language films
Korean-language Netflix original films
South Korean biographical films
South Korean films based on actual events
Upcoming Netflix original films